Pythagoras of Samos or Pythagoras of Rhegion (Ancient Greek: , fl. 5th century BC) was a sculptor from Samos whom Pliny the Elder expressly distinguishes from the more renowned Pythagoras the mathematician, from Rhegium. Pliny does however say that the sculptor bore a remarkable personal likeness to the mathematician.  There is no precise indication of his date.  Philip Smith accepted the opinion of Karl Julius Sillig (1801–1855) that Pliny's date of Olympiad 87 (c. 428 BC) ought to be referred to this artist rather than to a different Pythagoras, from Rhegium; other writers consider it possible he lived closer to the beginning of the 5th century BC. Modern writers consider it certain these two were the same artist, and that this Pythagoras was one of the Samian exiles who moved to Zankle at the beginning of the 5th century BC and came under the power of the tyrant Anaxilas in Rhegium.  While a Samian by birth, he was a pupil of Clearchus of Rhegium.

Pythagoras was at first a painter, but eventually turned to sculpture, apparently focusing on portraits of athletic champions from Hellenized cities in the Italian Peninsula and Sicily.  Despite his contemporary eminence in his field, it is difficult to estimate his skill and attainments, as no certain copy of his works is known to exist.  Pliny reports that Pythagoras' skill exceeded even that of Myron, credits him with the innovation of sculpting athletes with visible veins, and calls him the first artist to aim for "rhythm and symmetry".  In his Natural History he goes on to list several of Pythagoras' works, including a renowned pankratiast at Delphi.  He was celebrated as the maker of seven nude statues (which some theorize to have been a depiction of the Seven against Thebes), and one of an old man, which, in Pliny's time, stood near the temple of Fortuna Huiusce Diei ("The Fortune of This Day"), which Quintus Lutatius Catulus had built in fulfillment of a vow made at the Battle of Vercellae. Pausanias mentions a statuary of this name, and lists several of his works, including a sculpture of the boxer Euthymos, without mentioning this artist's home town.  The base of the statue has been found at Olympia however, on which Pythagoras signs himself as "the Samian".

References

Ancient Samians
Ancient Greek sculptors
5th-century BC Greek people
Ancient Rhegians